Maung Maung was the 7th president of the Union of Myanmar.

Maung Maung may also refer to:

 Phaungkaza Maung Maung (1763–1782), King of Burma for a week in 1782
 Maung Maung (union leader) (born 1952), Burmese trade union leader
 Maung Maung (1920–2009), Burmese diplomat, brigadier and author